Wiktor Suwara (born 24 July 1996) is a Polish athlete. He competed in the mixed 4 × 400 metres relay event at the 2019 World Athletics Championships.

References

External links

1996 births
Living people
Polish male sprinters
World Athletics Championships athletes for Poland
Sportspeople from Łódź
Universiade medalists in athletics (track and field)
Universiade bronze medalists for Poland
21st-century Polish people